The genevoise was the short-lived currency of Geneva between 1794 and 1795. It was subdivided into 10 decimes (singular: decimi). The genevoise replaced and was replaced by the thaler.

Coins
In 1794, silver coins were issued in denominations of ½ and 1 decimal and 1 genevoise.

References

Modern obsolete currencies
Currencies of Switzerland
1794 establishments in the Republic of Genoa
1795 disestablishments